Ted Duncan (born c. 1931) was a Canadian football player who played for the Calgary Stampeders and BC Lions. He played college football at the University of British Columbia.

References

1930s births
Living people
Canadian football quarterbacks
UBC Thunderbirds football players
BC Lions players
Calgary Stampeders players